Pachygrontha is a genus of seed bugs and allies in the family Pachygronthidae. There are more than 30 described species in Pachygrontha.

Species
These 37 species belong to the genus Pachygrontha:

 Pachygrontha africana Slater, 1955
 Pachygrontha angularis Reuter, 1887
 Pachygrontha angusta Stal, 1870
 Pachygrontha antennata (Uhler, 1860)
 Pachygrontha austrina Kirkaldy, 1907
 Pachygrontha bakeri Slater, 1955
 Pachygrontha barberi Slater, 1955
 Pachygrontha bipunctata Stal, 1865
 Pachygrontha brazilensis Slater, 1966
 Pachygrontha carinata Slater, 1955
 Pachygrontha compacta Distant, 1893
 Pachygrontha congoensis Slater, 1955
 Pachygrontha flavolineata Zheng, Zou & Hsiao, 1979
 Pachygrontha grossa Slater, 1955
 Pachygrontha harrisi Slater, 1955
 Pachygrontha lestoni Slater, 1955
 Pachygrontha lewisi Distant, 1901
 Pachygrontha lineata Germar, 1837
 Pachygrontha longiceps Stal, 1874
 Pachygrontha longicornis (Stal, 1865)
 Pachygrontha lurida Slater, 1955
 Pachygrontha minarum Lethierry & Severin, 1894
 Pachygrontha mirabilis Slater, 1978
 Pachygrontha miriformis Breddin, 1905
 Pachygrontha nigrovittata Stal, 1870
 Pachygrontha oedancalodes Stal, 1874
 Pachygrontha paralineata Slater, 1955
 Pachygrontha pseudolineata Slater, 1955
 Pachygrontha quadripunctata (Signoret, 1860)
 Pachygrontha robusta Slater, 1955
 Pachygrontha semperi Stal, 1870
 Pachygrontha similis Uhler, 1896
 Pachygrontha singularis Slater, 1975
 Pachygrontha solieri (Montrousier, 1864)
 Pachygrontha variegata Slater, 1966
 Pachygrontha vidua Horvath, 1900
 Pachygrontha walkeri Distant, 1901

References

External links

 

Lygaeoidea